Michael Logan Lampton (born March 1, 1941) is an American astronaut, founder of the optical ray tracing company Stellar Software, and known for his paper on electroacoustics with Susan M Lea, The theory of maximally flat loudspeaker systems.

Personal 
Lampton was born March 1, 1941, in Williamsport, Pennsylvania. He is married to San Francisco State University physicist, Susan M. Lea, with whom he has one daughter, Jennifer Lea Lampton.

Education 
 Bachelor of Science degree in Physics from Caltech, 1962
 Ph.D. in Physics from the University of California-Berkeley, 1967

SNAP Project 
Lampton has been heavily involved with the SNAP project.  SNAP, the Supernova/Acceleration Probe, will study exploding stars called supernovae, as well as the gentle smearing of the light from distant galaxies due to gravity — called weak gravitational lensing — and put limits on what may or may not be the force driving the outward pull on the Universe. SNAP will investigate over one thousand square degrees of sky with a 500 megapixel camera.

SNAP is part of the Joint Dark Energy Mission (JDEM), which is a cooperative venture between NASA and the U.S. Department of Energy. SNAP collaborators John Mather and George Smoot were awarded the 2006 Nobel prize in physics.

Career with NASA 
Lampton was a NASA payload specialist from 1978 to 1992.  Below is a list of the missions he was a part of.

Pranks 
In 1961, while Lampton was attending Caltech he was one of the "Fiendish Fourteen", 14 students responsible for the Great Rose Bowl Hoax.

References 

1941 births
Living people
American astronauts
University of California, Berkeley alumni
California Institute of Technology alumni